Not for the Faint of Heart: Lessons in Courage, Power and Persistence is a 2018 book by American diplomat Wendy Sherman based on her time as the lead United States negotiator, during the Iran nuclear deal (JCPOA).

Content
The book Not for the Faint of Heart: Lessons in Courage, Power and Persistence is about the memoirs of American chief negotiator Wendy Sherman during Iran nuclear deal. The book is "a complete explanation of how the JCPOA was drafted and approved" from Wendy Sherman's point of view. The book takes the reader to the world of international diplomacy and brings their mind to the mind of one of the most effective negotiators who is often the only woman in the room. The author admits why it is difficult to do well in her field. By reading Not for the Faint of Heart, the reader will learn how to apply key diplomacy skills to their daily lives and face challenges.

In this book, Wendy Sherman has tried to tell about her experiences to overcome the obstacles faced by women not only in international diplomacy but in everyday life.

Release
The book Not for the Faint of Heart: Lessons in Courage, Power and Persistence was first published originally in English language in September 2018 by PublicAffairs Books in the United States. The book was translated into Persian and published in Iran in 2019. In April 2020, this book was introduced in Iran as the best-selling book of the Islamic Revolution Document Center Publications.

Reception
Madeleine Albright, the 64th Secretary of State of the United States, described Sherman's book as "A powerful, deeply personal, and absorbing book written by one of America’s smartest and most dedicated diplomats." John Kerry, the 68th Secretary of State of the United States, said that "Wendy doesn’t just write about the value of courage, power, and persistence, she lives it. She’s an example that a strong negotiator can also be a humane mentor."

See also
 Manufactured Crisis: The Untold Story of the Iran Nuclear Scare
 Foucault in Iran: Islamic Revolution after the Enlightenment
 Iran Between Two Revolutions
 Zero Days
 War on Peace
 National Security and Nuclear Diplomacy
 On the Road to Kandahar
 The Pragmatic Entente: Israeli-Iranian Relations, 1948-1988

References

External links
 Not for the Faint of Heart: Lessons in Courage, Power, and Persistence by Wendy R. Sherman on Goodreads
 Not for the Faint of Heart Lessons in Courage, Power, and Persistence – Ambassador Wendy R. Sherman – Google Books
 Not for the Faint of Heart: Lessons in Courage, Power, and Persistence – Stanford University
 Not for the Faint of Heart, Lessons in Courage, Power, and Persistence by Wendy R. Sherman – Booktopia

2018 non-fiction books
American non-fiction books
American political books
Books about international relations
Books about nuclear issues
Nuclear weapons policy
Nuclear program of Iran
English-language books
Political memoirs
PublicAffairs books
Iran–United States relations